Miroslav Soviš (24 January 1954 – 9 January 2015) was a Czech biathlete. He competed in the relay event at the 1976 Winter Olympics.

References

External links
 

1954 births
2015 deaths
Czech male biathletes
Olympic biathletes of Czechoslovakia
Biathletes at the 1976 Winter Olympics
People from Uherské Hradiště District
Sportspeople from the Zlín Region